Tabasco is a Mexican state.

Tabasco may also refer to:

In food
 Tabasco pepper, chili pepper
 Tabasco sauce, sauce made in part from the peppers

In geography

Mexico
 Tabasco, Francisco Z. Mena
 Tabasco, José María Morelos
 Tabasco, Las Margaritas
 Tabasco, Zacatecas
 Tabasco River, Mexico
 Tabasco (former state), a Chontal Maya Nation

United States
 Tabasco, New York, a hamlet
 Tobasco, Ohio, an unincorporated community
 Tabasco Creek, Alaska

Other uses
 Tabasco mud turtle
 Burlesque Opera of Tabasco by George Whitefield Chadwick
 Simona Tabasco (born 1994), Italian actress